The following is a list of aircraft used by Italian Air Force (Aeronautica Militare) since its formation on June 18, 1946.

Aircraft

References

aircraft
Italy